East Brunswick Vocational Technical High School (also known as MCVTS at East Brunswick, East Brunswick Tech, EB Tech, EBVT and East Brunswick Vo-Tech) is a four-year career academy and college preparatory magnet public high school serving students in ninth through twelfth grades located in East Brunswick in Middlesex County, New Jersey, United States, operating as part of the Middlesex County Vocational and Technical Schools. The school serves students of many diverse cultures from all over Middlesex County.

As of the 2021–22 school year, the school had an enrollment of 465 students and 38.0 classroom teachers (on an FTE basis), for a student–teacher ratio of 12.2:1. There were 109 students (23.4% of enrollment) eligible for free lunch and 28 (6.0% of students) eligible for reduced-cost lunch.

Athletics
The East Brunswick Tech Tigers compete in the Greater Middlesex Conference, which is comprised of public and private high schools in the Middlesex County area, and operates under the supervision of the New Jersey State Interscholastic Athletic Association (NJSIAA). With 555 students in grades 10-12, the school was classified by the NJSIAA for the 2019–20 school year as Group II for most athletic competition purposes, which included schools with an enrollment of 486 to 758 students in that grade range.

School colors are orange, black, and white. In the fall, the school offers soccer and cross country. In the winter, there is boys' basketball, girls' basketball, and cheerleading. In addition to offering their typical varsity and junior varsity teams for cheerleading, there is a separate team that does competition cheer around the state. In the spring, there is softball and baseball.

Clubs
In addition to sports, the school offers several clubs including:
Anime Club
Class Committee 
DECA
Dungeons & Dragons Club
FFA
National Technical Honor Society
Gender and Sexual Minorities and Allies (GSMA)
Guitar Club
HOSA
Skills USA
Student Council
Stripes Literary Magazine
Thespian Society
TSA
Yearbook Committee

Shops
East Brunswick Tech offers a variety of shops, but is most notable for their School of the Arts programs, which include:
Graphic Design/Commercial Art
Theatre
Digital Filmmaking
Multimedia Art
Dance
Arts Technology (non-audition)
Music Performance and Technology

Other shops include:
Automotive Technology
Machine Tool Technology
Computer Architectural Design
Heating, Ventilation, Air Conditioning & Refrigeration Technology
Agriscience Technology
Baking
Cosmetology and Hairstyling
Pre-Engineering

In addition to the regular programs, there is a special-needs program, which has options in:
Automotive Services
Basic Business Technology
Building Services/Maintenance Mechanics
Building Trades/Carpentry
Culinary Arts
Dry Cleaning
Health Services
Heating, Ventilation, and Air Conditioning

School of the Arts
The School of the Arts puts on several productions throughout the year, specifically:
Senior Showcase, a collaboration between all seven arts shops (November)
Full-production winter Dance show, in collaboration with Arts Technology (December)
Choreography showcase, featuring a number of student-created short dance pieces (February)
Main stage theatre production, generally alternating between Shakespearean and contemporary plays, collaboration with Arts Technology (March/April)
Reel Film Festival (May)
Spring dance concert, a series of mid-length pieces (May)
Freshman Showcase, a series of short plays showcasing the freshmen from Theatre and Arts Technology (May)

Other shows may be added throughout the year.

Administration
Core members of the school's administration include the principals and two vice principals:
Michael Cappiello, Principal
Robert Feldman, Principal School of Career Development

Notable alumni
 Brian D. Sicknick (1978–2021), officer of the United States Capitol Police who died following the January 6 United States Capitol attack.

References

External links
School website
Middlesex County Vocational and Technical Schools

National Center for Educational Statistics data for the Middlesex County Vocational and Technical Schools

East Brunswick, New Jersey
Magnet schools in New Jersey
Public high schools in Middlesex County, New Jersey